, provisional designation , is a sub-kilometer asteroid, classified as near-Earth object and potentially hazardous asteroid of the Apollo group. It was removed from the Sentry Risk Table on 21 December 2012 and as such it now has a rating of 0 on the Torino Scale. It was recovered in December 2022 extending the observation arc from 4.8 years to 14 years.

Description 

 was discovered on 8 January 2011 by the Mount Lemmon Survey at an apparent magnitude of 19.6 using a  reflecting telescope. Pan-STARRS precovery images from 8 November 2010 extended the observation arc to 317 days. Observations by the Gemini  telescope at Mauna Kea recovered the asteroid on October 20, 21 and 27, 2012, and extended the observation arc to 719 days.

The October 2012 observations reduced the orbit uncertainties by more than a factor of 60, meaning that the Earth's position in February 2040 no longer falls within the range of possible future paths for the asteroid. Until 21 December 2012 it was listed on the Sentry Risk Table with a rating on the Torino Scale of Level 1. A Torino rating of 1 is a routine discovery in which a pass near the Earth is predicted that poses no unusual level of danger. It is estimated that an impact would produce the equivalent of 100 megatons of TNT, roughly twice that of the most powerful nuclear weapon ever detonated (Tsar Bomba). This is powerful enough to damage a region at least a hundred miles wide.

Older risks  
Virtual clones of the asteroid that fit the mid-2012 uncertainty region in the known trajectory showed four potential impacts between 2040 and 2047. It had a 1 in 500 chance of impacting the Earth on 5 February 2040. In September 2013, there was an opportunity to make additional observations of  when it came within  of Earth. The 2013 observations allowed a further refinement to the known trajectory. The asteroid will also pass  from the Earth on 3 February 2023. The 2023 gravitational keyhole was 227 miles (365 kilometers) wide.

References

External links 
 UH Observations Result in "All Clear" for Potential Asteroid Impact (Institute for Astronomy at the University of Hawaii December 21, 2012)
 Phew! One Less Asteroid Impact to Worry About (Phil Plait Dec. 22, 2012)
 Table of next close approaches (Sormano Astronomical Observatory)
 MBPL - Minor Body Priority List (Sormano Astronomical Observatory)
 
 
 

367789
367789
367789
367789
20110108
20230203
20110108